Canada DanceSport (CDS) is the governing body for competitive ballroom dancing in Canada. It is a member of the World DanceSport Federation and the Canadian Olympic Committee. CDS sanctions the annual Canadian Closed Championships.

Within Canada, CDS has several regional associations:
Danse Sport Québec (DSQ)
DanceSport Alberta (DSAB)
DanceSport Atlantic Association (DAA)
DanceSport BC (DSBC)
Ontario DanceSport (ODS)

External links
CDS website

Dancesport in Canada
Sports governing bodies in Canada